Dichagyris capota is a species of cutworm or dart moth in the family Noctuidae.

The MONA or Hodges number for Dichagyris capota is 10876.

References

Further reading

 
 
 

capota
Articles created by Qbugbot
Moths described in 1908
Moths of North America